The women's team compound competition at the 2009 World Archery Championships took place on 2–8 September 2009 in Ulsan, South Korea. 21 teams of 3 archers took part in the women's compound qualification round on 1 September. The 16 teams with the highest cumulative totals qualified for the 4-round knockout round on 7 September which was drawn according to their qualification round scores. The semi-finals and finals then took place on 8 September.

Second seeds Russia defeated South Korea in the final.

Seeds
Seedings were based on the combined total of the team members' qualification scores in the individual ranking rounds. The top 16 teams were assigned places in the draw depending on their overall ranking.

Draw

References

2009 World Archery Championships
World